Campion is a surname. Notable people with the surname include:

 Bill Campion (born 1952), American basketball player
 Carlo Antonio Campioni (born Charles Antoine Campion; 1720–1788), Italian composer 
 Cassie Jackman (born 1972), English squash player, also known as Cassie Campion
 Ed Campion (1915–2005), American basketball player
 Édith Cresson (born Édith Campion; 1934), French politician 
Edith Campion (1923—2007), New Zealand actress, writer and co-founder of the New Zealand Players 
 Saint Edmund Campion SJ (1540–1581), English Jesuit and Catholic martyr
 Edmund Campion (historian) (born 1933), Australian priest and historian
 Gerald Campion (1921–2002), English actor
 Kevin Campion (rugby league) (born 1971), Australian rugby league player
 Jane Campion (born 1954), New Zealand film director
 John F. Campion (1848–1916), Irish-American mine owner, investor, and philanthropist
 John Joseph Campion (1963–2020), Irish-American businessman
 Maria Ann Campion (1777–1803), Irish actress
 Paul Campion (film director) (born 1967), English film director
 Paul Campion (French Navy officer) (fl. 1904), French admiral
 Paul Campion (radio host) (born 1969), Australian radio host
 Richard Campion (theatre director) (1923–2013), New Zealand theatre director
 Sarah Campion (1906–2002), pseudonym of Mary Rose Alpers, novelist and social activist
 Thomas Campion (1567–1620), English composer, poet, and physician
 T. J. Campion (1918-1996), American Football Player
 Vikki Campion, spouse of the 17th Deputy Prime Minister of Australia and 13th leader of the National Party Barnaby Joyce
 Sir William Campion (governor) KCMG (1870–1951), English politician and governor of Western Australia
 William Campion (1640-1702), MP for Kent
 William Campion (organist) (fl. 1543), English musician
Denys Campion Potts (1923–2016), English academic

Fictional characters
 Albert Campion, fictional detective
 Charles D. Campion, character in The Stand

See also
Campion (disambiguation)

English-language surnames
Surnames of Norman origin